The long-horned Raya cattle are a breed of cattle common in the Tigray Region of Ethiopia. The Raya cattle have red and black coat colours. Bulls and oxen have thick and long horns and a cervicothoracic hump; cows have medium, thin horns. Raya cattle are closely related to the Afar cattle; this is a result of historical cattle raiding by the Raya people. The Raya cattle are however adapted to draught animals for tillage in the croplands of the highlands.

Closely related types
 Afar cattle

Origin of the cattle breed 

Ethiopia has been at a crossroads for cattle immigration to Africa due to
 proximity to the geographical entry of Indian and Arabian zebu
 proximity to Near-Eastern and European taurine
 introgression with West African taurine due to pastoralism
Furthermore, the diverse agro-ecology led to diverse farming systems which, in turn, made Ethiopia a centre of secondary diversification for livestock : 
 The Sanga cattle (including the Raya breed) originated in Ethiopia. They are a major bovine group in Africa – a cross-breeding of local long-horned taurines and Arabian zebus
 The Zenga (Zebu-Sanga) breeds, which resulted from a second introduction and crossing with Indian zebu

Breeding and genetic resource management 
The lowlands of Ethiopia are good for cattle breeding: there is abundant feed in the rangelands, and pastoral communities have a good knowledge and practice of selective and controlled breeding. Hence, the breed reproduction is much better for the agro-pastoral Raya breeds than for the generalist Arado cattle breed of the Highlands. Raya breeders use traditional methods of animal identification and intra-breed selection. They also cull unwanted male calves based on information on their genitors. Raya breeders have a sense of collective breed ownership. They only sell off oxen to outsiders, in order to protect and maintain the genetic resource from interbreeding with adjacent breeds.

Stresses on the cattle breed 
 socio-political: urbanisation, and civil wars
 panzootic: cattle plague
 environmental: destruction of ecosystems and droughts

References 

Cattle breeds
Cattle breeds originating in Ethiopia
Tigray Region